Beverly Long may refer to:

 Beverly Long (activist) (1920–2015), American Civil Rights and mental health activist
 Beverly Long (actress) (1933–2014), American film and television actress